This is a list of the bird species recorded in the Northern Mariana Islands. The avifauna of the Northern Mariana Islands include a total of 180 species. 

This list's taxonomic treatment (designation and sequence of orders, families and species) and nomenclature (common and scientific names) follow the conventions of The Clements Checklist of Birds of the World, 2022 edition. The family accounts at the beginning of each heading reflect this taxonomy, as do the species counts found in each family account. Introduced and accidental species are included in the total counts for the Northern Mariana Islands.

The following tags have been used to highlight several categories. The commonly occurring native species do not fall into any of these categories.

(A) Accidental - a species that rarely or accidentally occurs in the Northern Mariana Islands
(I) Introduced - a species introduced to the Northern Mariana Islands as a consequence, direct or indirect, of human actions
(E) Endemic - a species endemic to the Northern Mariana Islands

Ducks, geese, and waterfowl
Order: AnseriformesFamily: Anatidae

Anatidae includes the ducks and most duck-like waterfowl, such as geese and swans. These birds are adapted to an aquatic existence with webbed feet, flattened bills, and feathers that are excellent at shedding water due to an oily coating.

Tundra swan, Cygnus columbianus (A)
Garganey, Spatula querquedula
Northern shoveler, Spatula clypeata (A)
Gadwall, Mareca strepera
Falcated duck, Mareca falcata (A)
Eurasian wigeon, Mareca penelope
American wigeon, Mareca americana
Eastern spot-billed duck, Anas zonorhyncha (A)
Mallard, Anas platyrhynchos
Northern pintail, Anas acuta (A)
Green-winged teal, Anas crecca (A)
Common pochard, Aythya ferina
Baer's pochard, Aythya baeri (A)
Tufted duck, Aythya fuligula
Greater scaup, Aythya marila
Lesser scaup, Aythya affinis (A)
Red-breasted merganser, Mergus serrator (A)

Megapodes
Order: GalliformesFamily: Megapodiidae

The Megapodiidae are stocky, medium-large chicken-like birds with small heads and large feet. All but the malleefowl occupy jungle habitats and most have brown or black coloring. 

Micronesian scrubfowl, Megapodius laperouse

Pheasants, grouse, and allies
Order: GalliformesFamily: Phasianidae

The Phasianidae are a family of terrestrial birds. In general, they are plump (although they vary in size) and have broad, relatively short wings.

Red junglefowl, Gallus gallus (I)

Pigeons and doves
Order: ColumbiformesFamily: Columbidae

Pigeons and doves are stout-bodied birds with short necks and short slender bills with a fleshy cere.

Rock pigeon, Columba livia (I)
Philippine collared-dove, Streptopelia dusumieri (I)
White-throated ground dove, Alopecoenas xanthonurus
Mariana fruit-dove, Ptilinopus roseicapilla

Cuckoos
Order: CuculiformesFamily: Cuculidae

The family Cuculidae includes cuckoos, roadrunners and anis. These birds are of variable size with slender bodies, long tails and strong legs. The Old World cuckoos are brood parasites.

Long-tailed koel, Urodynamis taitensis (A)
Oriental cuckoo, Cuculus optatus (A)

Swifts
Order: CaprimulgiformesFamily: Apodidae

Swifts are small birds which spend the majority of their lives flying. These birds have very short legs and never settle voluntarily on the ground, perching instead only on vertical surfaces. Many swifts have long swept-back wings which resemble a crescent or boomerang.

White-throated needletail, Hirundapus caudacutus (A)
Mariana swiftlet, Aerodramus bartschi
Caroline Islands swiftlet, Aerodramus inquietus
Pacific swift, Apus pacificus

Rails, gallinules, and coots
Order: GruiformesFamily: Rallidae

Rallidae is a large family of small to medium-sized birds which includes the rails, crakes, coots and gallinules. Typically they inhabit dense vegetation in damp environments near lakes, swamps or rivers. In general they are shy and secretive birds, making them difficult to observe. Most species have strong legs and long toes which are well adapted to soft uneven surfaces. They tend to have short, rounded wings and to be weak fliers.

Guam rail, Gallirallus owstoni
Eurasian moorhen, Gallinula chloropus
Eurasian coot, Fulica atra (A)

Stilts and avocets
Order: CharadriiformesFamily: Recurvirostridae

Recurvirostridae is a family of large wading birds, which includes the avocets and stilts. The avocets have long legs and long up-curved bills. The stilts have extremely long legs and long, thin, straight bills.

Black-winged stilt, Himantopus himantopus
Pied stilt, Himantopus leucocephalus
Black-necked stilt, Himantopus mexicanus

Plovers and lapwings
Order: CharadriiformesFamily: Charadriidae

The family Charadriidae includes the plovers, dotterels and lapwings. They are small to medium-sized birds with compact bodies, short, thick necks and long, usually pointed, wings. They are found in open country worldwide, mostly in habitats near water.

Black-bellied plover, Pluvialis squatarola
Pacific golden-plover, Pluvialis fulva
Lesser sand-plover, Charadrius mongolus
Greater sand-plover, Charadrius leschenaultii
Kentish plover, Charadrius alexandrinus
Common ringed plover, Charadrius hiaticula
Long-billed plover, Charadrius placidus (A)
Little ringed plover, Charadrius dubius

Jacanas
Order: CharadriiformesFamily: Jacanidae

The jacanas are a group of tropical waders in the family Jacanidae. They are found throughout the tropics. They are identifiable by their huge feet and claws which enable them to walk on floating vegetation in the shallow lakes that are their preferred habitat.

Pheasant-tailed jacana, Hydrophasianus chirurgus (A)

Sandpipers and allies
Order: CharadriiformesFamily: Scolopacidae

Scolopacidae is a large diverse family of small to medium-sized shorebirds including the sandpipers, curlews, godwits, shanks, tattlers, woodcocks, snipes, dowitchers and phalaropes. The majority of these species eat small invertebrates picked out of the mud or soil. Variation in length of legs and bills enables multiple species to feed in the same habitat, particularly on the coast, without direct competition for food.

Bristle-thighed curlew, Numenius tahitiensis
Whimbrel, Numenius phaeopus
Little curlew, Numenius minutus
Far Eastern curlew, Numenius madagascariensis
Eurasian curlew, Numenius arquata
Bar-tailed godwit, Limosa lapponica
Black-tailed godwit, Limosa limosa
Ruddy turnstone, Arenaria interpres
Great knot, Calidris tenuirostris
Ruff, Calidris pugnax
Broad-billed sandpiper, Calidris falcinellus (A)
Sharp-tailed sandpiper, Calidris acuminata
Curlew sandpiper, Calidris ferruginea (A)
Temminck's stint, Calidris temminckii (A)
Long-toed stint, Calidris subminuta
Red-necked stint, Calidris ruficollis
Sanderling, Calidris alba
Dunlin, Calidris alpina
Little stint, Calidris minuta (A)
Buff-breasted sandpiper, Calidris subruficollis (A)
Pectoral sandpiper, Calidris melanotos
Long-billed dowitcher, Limnodromus scolopaceus
Common snipe, Gallinago gallinago
Pin-tailed snipe, Gallinago stenura (A)
Swinhoe's snipe, Gallinago megala
Terek sandpiper, Xenus cinereus
Red-necked phalarope, Phalaropus lobatus (A)
Common sandpiper, Actitis hypoleucos
Green sandpiper, Tringa ochropus (A)
Gray-tailed tattler, Tringa brevipes
Wandering tattler, Tringa incana
Greater yellowlegs, Tringa melanoleuca (A)
Common greenshank, Tringa nebularia
Marsh sandpiper, Tringa stagnatilis
Wood sandpiper, Tringa glareola
Common redshank, Tringa totanus

Pratincoles and coursers
Order: CharadriiformesFamily: Glareolidae

Glareolidae is a family of wading birds comprising the pratincoles, which have short legs, long pointed wings and long forked tails, and the coursers, which have long legs, short wings and long, pointed bills which curve downwards.

Oriental pratincole, Glareola maldivarum

Skuas and jaegers
Order: CharadriiformesFamily: Stercorariidae

The family Stercorariidae are, in general, medium to large birds, typically with grey or brown plumage, often with white markings on the wings. They nest on the ground in temperate and arctic regions and are long-distance migrants.

South Polar skua, Stercorarius maccormicki (A)
Pomarine jaeger, Stercorarius pomarinus
Parasitic jaeger, Stercorarius parasiticus (A)
Long-tailed jaeger, Stercorarius longicaudus

Gulls, terns, and skimmers
Order: CharadriiformesFamily: Laridae

Laridae is a family of medium to large seabirds, the gulls, terns, and skimmers. Gulls are typically gray or white, often with black markings on the head or wings. They have stout, longish bills and webbed feet. Terns are a group of generally medium to large seabirds typically with gray or white plumage, often with black markings on the head. Most terns hunt fish by diving but some pick insects off the surface of fresh water. Terns are generally long-lived birds, with several species known to live in excess of 30 years.

Black-headed gull, Chroicocephalus ridibundus
Laughing gull, Leucophaeus atricilla (A)
Black-tailed gull, Larus crassirostris (A)
Herring gull, Larus argentatus (A)
Slaty-backed gull, Larus schistisagus (A)
Brown noddy, Anous stolidus
Black noddy, Anous minutus
White tern, Gygis alba
Sooty tern, Onychoprion fuscatus
Gray-backed tern, Onychoprion lunatus
Little tern, Sternula albifrons
White-winged tern, Chlidonias leucopterus
Whiskered tern, Onychoprion hybrida
Black-naped tern, Sterna sumatrana
Common tern, Sterna hirundo
Great crested tern, Thalasseus bergii

Tropicbirds
Order: PhaethontiformesFamily: Phaethontidae

Tropicbirds are slender white birds of tropical oceans, with exceptionally long central tail feathers. Their heads and long wings have black markings.

White-tailed tropicbird, Phaethon lepturus
Red-tailed tropicbird, Phaethon rubricauda

Albatrosses
Order: ProcellariiformesFamily: Diomedeidae

The albatrosses are a family of large seabird found across the Southern and North Pacific Oceans. The largest are among the largest flying birds in the world.

Laysan albatross, Phoebastria immutabilis

Southern storm-petrels
Order: ProcellariiformesFamily: Oceanitidae

The southern storm-petrels are relatives of the petrels and are the smallest seabirds. They feed on planktonic crustaceans and small fish picked from the surface, typically while hovering. The flight is fluttering and sometimes bat-like.

Wilson's storm-petrel, Oceanites oceanicus (A)

Northern storm-petrels
Order: ProcellariiformesFamily: Hydrobatidae

The northern-storm petrels are relatives of the petrels and are the smallest seabirds. They feed on planktonic crustaceans and small fish picked from the surface, typically while hovering. The flight is fluttering and sometimes bat-like.

Leach's storm-petrel, Hydrobates leucorhous
Band-rumped storm-petrel, Hydrobates castro (A)
Matsudaira's storm-petrel, Hydrobates matsudairae
Tristram's storm-petrel, Hydrobates tristrami (A)

Shearwaters and petrels
Order: ProcellariiformesFamily: Procellariidae

The procellariids are the main group of medium-sized "true petrels", characterized by united nostrils with medium septum and a long outer functional primary. 

White-necked petrel, Pterodroma cervicalis  
Bonin petrel, Pterodroma hypoleuca 
Black-winged petrel, Pterodroma nigripennis
Bulwer's petrel, Bulweria bulwerii  
Streaked shearwater, Calonectris leucomelas
Wedge-tailed shearwater, Ardenna pacificus
Short-tailed shearwater, Ardenna tenuirostris
Christmas shearwater, Puffinus nativitatis
Bannerman's shearwater, Puffinus bannermani
Newell's shearwater, Puffinus newelli
Tropical shearwater, Puffinus bailloni

Frigatebirds
Order: SuliformesFamily: Fregatidae

Frigatebirds are large seabirds usually found over tropical oceans. They are large, black and white or completely black, with long wings and deeply forked tails. The males have colored inflatable throat pouches. They do not swim or walk and cannot take off from a flat surface. Having the largest wingspan-to-body-weight ratio of any bird, they are essentially aerial, able to stay aloft for more than a week.

Lesser frigatebird, Fregata ariel
Great frigatebird, Fregata minor

Boobies and gannets
Order: SuliformesFamily: Sulidae

The sulids comprise the gannets and boobies. Both groups are medium to large coastal seabirds that plunge-dive for fish.

Masked booby, Sula dactylatra
Brown booby, Sula leucogaster
Red-footed booby, Sula sula
Abbott's booby, Papasula abbotti (A)

Cormorants and shags
Order: SuliformesFamily: Phalacrocoracidae

Phalacrocoracidae is a family of medium to large coastal, fish-eating seabirds that includes cormorants and shags. Plumage coloration varies, with the majority having mainly dark plumage, some species being black-and-white and a few being colorful. 

Little pied cormorant, Microcarbo melanoleucos (A)
Great cormorant, Phalacrocorax carbo (A)

Herons, egrets, and bitterns
Order: PelecaniformesFamily: Ardeidae

The family Ardeidae contains the bitterns, herons, and egrets. Herons and egrets are medium to large wading birds with long necks and legs. Bitterns tend to be shorter necked and more wary. Members of Ardeidae fly with their necks retracted, unlike other long-necked birds such as storks, ibises and spoonbills. 

Yellow bittern, Ixobrychus sinensis
Cinnamon bittern, Ixobrychus cinnamomeus (A)
Black bittern, Ixobrychus flavicollis (A)
Gray heron, Ardea cinerea
Great egret, Ardea alba
Intermediate egret, Ardea intermedia (A)
Little egret, Egretta garzetta (A)
Pacific reef-heron, Egretta sacra
Cattle egret, Bubulcus ibis
Striated heron, Butorides striata 
Black-crowned night-heron, Nycticorax nycticorax 
Nankeen night-heron, Nycticorax caledonicus (A)

Osprey
Order: AccipitriformesFamily: Pandionidae

The family Pandionidae contains only one species, the osprey. The osprey is a medium-large raptor which is a specialist fish-eater with a worldwide distribution.

Osprey, Pandion haliaetus

Hawks, eagles, and kites
Order: AccipitriformesFamily: Accipitridae

Accipitridae is a family of birds of prey, which includes hawks, eagles, kites, harriers and Old World vultures. These birds have powerful hooked beaks for tearing flesh from their prey, strong legs, powerful talons and keen eyesight.
 
Eastern marsh-harrier, Circus spilonotus (A)
Chinese Sparrowhawk, Accipiter soloensis
Black kite, Milvus migrans 
Common buzzard, Buteo buteo
Eastern buzzard, Buteo japonicus (A)

Owls
Order: StrigiformesFamily: Strigidae

The typical owls are small to large solitary nocturnal birds of prey. They have large forward-facing eyes and ears, a hawk-like beak and a conspicuous circle of feathers around each eye called a facial disk.

Short-eared owl, Asio flammeus (A)

Hoopoes
Order: BucerotiformesFamily: Upupidae

Hoopoes have black, white and orangey-pink coloring with a large erectile crest on their head.

Eurasian hoopoe, Upupa epops

Kingfishers
Order: CoraciiformesFamily: Alcedinidae

Kingfishers are medium-sized birds with large heads, long pointed bills, short legs and stubby tails.

Collared kingfisher, Todirhamphus chloris
Mariana kingfisher, Todirhamphus albicilla (E)

Rollers
Order: CoraciiformesFamily: Coraciidae

Rollers resemble crows in size and build, but are more closely related to the kingfishers and bee-eaters. They share the colourful appearance of those groups with blues and browns predominating. The two inner front toes are connected, but the outer toe is not.

Dollarbird, Eurystomus orientalis

Falcons and caracaras
Order: FalconiformesFamily: Falconidae

Falconidae is a family of diurnal birds of prey. They differ from hawks, eagles and kites in that they kill with their beaks instead of their talons. 

Eurasian kestrel, Falco tinnunculus
Amur falcon, Falco amurensis (A)
Peregrine falcon, Falco peregrinus

Honeyeaters
Order: PasseriformesFamily: Meliphagidae

The honeyeaters are a large and diverse family of small to medium-sized birds most common in Australia and New Guinea. They are nectar feeders and closely resemble other nectar-feeding passerines.

Micronesian myzomela, Myzomela rubratra

Cuckooshrikes
Order: PasseriformesFamily: Campephagidae

The cuckooshrikes are small to medium-sized passerine birds. They are predominantly greyish with white and black, although some species are brightly colored.

Ashy minivet, Pericrocotus divaricatus (A)

Fantails
Order: PasseriformesFamily: Rhipiduridae

The fantails are small insectivorous birds which are specialist aerial feeders.

Rufous fantail, Rhipidura rufifrons

Drongos
Order: PasseriformesFamily: Dicruridae

The drongos are mostly black or dark grey in color, sometimes with metallic tints. They have long forked tails, and some Asian species have elaborate tail decorations. They have short legs and sit very upright when perched, like a shrike. They flycatch or take prey from the ground.

Black drongo, Dicrurus macrocercus (I)

Monarch flycatchers
Order: PasseriformesFamily: Monarchidae

The monarch flycatchers are small to medium-sized insectivorous passerines which hunt by flycatching.

Tinian monarch, Monarcha takatsukasae (E)

Crows, jays, and magpies
Order: PasseriformesFamily: Corvidae

The family Corvidae includes crows, ravens, jays, choughs, magpies, treepies, nutcrackers and ground jays. Corvids are above average in size among the Passeriformes, and some of the larger species show high levels of intelligence.

Mariana crow, Corvus kubaryi

Reed warblers and allies
Order: PasseriformesFamily: Acrocephalidae

The members of this family are usually rather large for "warblers". Most are rather plain olivaceous brown above with much yellow to beige below. They are usually found in open woodland, reedbeds, or tall grass. The family occurs mostly in southern to western Eurasia and surroundings, but it also ranges far into the Pacific, with some species in Africa.

Nightingale reed warbler, Acrocephalus luscinia 
Saipan reed warbler, Acrocephalus hiwae (E)
Aguiguan reed warbler, Acrocephalus nijoi (E)
Pagan reed warbler, Acrocephalus yamashinae (E)

Swallows
Order: PasseriformesFamily: Hirundinidae

The family Hirundinidae is adapted to aerial feeding. They have a slender streamlined body, long pointed wings and a short bill with a wide gape. The feet are adapted to perching rather than walking, and the front toes are partially joined at the base.

Barn swallow, Hirundo rustica

White-eyes, yuhinas, and allies
Order: PasseriformesFamily: Zosteropidae

The white-eyes are small and mostly undistinguished, their plumage above being generally some dull color like greenish-olive, but some species have a white or bright yellow throat, breast or lower parts, and several have buff flanks. As their name suggests, many species have a white ring around each eye.

Golden white-eye, Cleptornis marchei (E)
Bridled white-eye, Zosterops conspicillatus
Rota white-eye, Zosterops rotensis (E)

Starlings
Order: PasseriformesFamily: Sturnidae

Starlings are small to medium-sized passerine birds. Their flight is strong and direct and they are very gregarious. Their preferred habitat is fairly open country. They eat insects and fruit. Plumage is typically dark with a metallic sheen.

Micronesian starling, Aplonis opaca
White-cheeked starling, Spodiopsar cineraceus (A)

Thrushes and allies
Order: PasseriformesFamily: Turdidae

The thrushes are a group of passerine birds that occur mainly in the Old World. They are plump, soft plumaged, small to medium-sized insectivores or sometimes omnivores, often feeding on the ground. Many have attractive songs.

Dusky thrush, Turdus eunomus (A)

Old World flycatchers
Order: PasseriformesFamily: Muscicapidae

Old World flycatchers are a large group of small passerine birds native to the Old World. They are mainly small arboreal insectivores. The appearance of these birds is highly varied, but they mostly have weak songs and harsh calls.

Gray-streaked flycatcher, Muscicapa griseisticta (A)

Waxbills and allies
Order: PasseriformesFamily: Estrildidae

The estrildid finches are small passerine birds of the Old World tropics and Australasia. They are gregarious and often colonial seed eaters with short thick but pointed bills. They are all similar in structure and habits, but have wide variation in plumage colors and patterns.

Orange-cheeked waxbill, Estrilda melpoda (I)
Chestnut munia, Lonchura atricapilla (I)

Old World sparrows
Order: PasseriformesFamily: Passeridae

Old World sparrows are small passerine birds. In general, sparrows tend to be small, plump, brown or grey birds with short tails and short powerful beaks. Sparrows are seed eaters, but they also consume small insects.

Eurasian tree sparrow, Passer montanus (I)

Wagtails and pipits
Order: PasseriformesFamily: Motacillidae

Motacillidae is a family of small passerine birds with medium to long tails. They include the wagtails, longclaws and pipits. They are slender, ground feeding insectivores of open country.

Gray wagtail, Motacilla cinerea (A)
Western yellow wagtail, Motacilla flava (A)
Eastern yellow wagtail, Motacilla tschutschensis (A)
White wagtail, Motacilla alba (A)

See also
List of birds
Lists of birds by region

References

Northern Mariana Islands
'|birds
birds
'|Northern Mariana Islands